The Ministry of Social Empowerment, Welfare and Kandyan Heritage is the central government ministry of Sri Lanka responsible for social services, social welfare and Kandyan heritage. The ministry is responsible for formulating and implementing national policy on social empowerment and welfare and other subjects which come under its purview. The current Minister of Social Empowerment, Welfare and Kandyan Heritage and Deputy Minister of Social Empowerment, Welfare and Kandyan Heritage are S. B. Dissanayake and Ranjan Ramanayake respectively. The ministry's secretary is Mahinda Seneviratne.

Ministers
The Minister of Social Empowerment, Welfare and Kandyan Heritage is a member of the Cabinet of Sri Lanka.

Secretaries

References

External links
 

Social Empowerment, Welfare and Kandyan Heritage
Social Empowerment, Welfare and Kandyan Heritage
 
Sri Lanka